Barbie is  video game for the Commodore 64 published by Epyx in 1984. It allows players to participate in the life of the famous fashion doll of the same name.

Gameplay

Players must talk to their boyfriend Ken (using a real voice audio soundtrack) in addition to driving a yellow convertible around town, trying out swimming outfits (both one-piece and two-piece swimsuits can be used) in addition to dresses and shoes. Options for dates include either a dinner out on the town or a relaxing day at the beach. An incorrect combination of clothing will force Barbie to skip the date sequence and work her way towards the next objective while a correct combination will allow players to see Barbie and her date in a photograph of the event.

Reception

Reviewing the game for Run Magazine, Marilyn Annucci gave it a score of C (the middle of 5 possible scores, which the magazine describes as "Good"), complimenting it's detailed graphics and "unusually realistic sound", she was highly critical of the programs "many sexist elements" including how much of the game was built around playing to the whims of Ken. She also thought that children would quickly tire of the "unimpressive" gameplay.

References

Barbie video games
1984 video games
Action video games
Commodore 64 games
Commodore 64-only games
Single-player video games
Video games developed in the United States
Epyx games